A Hunger Artist is the collection of four short stories by Franz Kafka published in Germany in 1924, the last collection that Kafka himself prepared for publication. Kafka was able to correct the proofs during his final illness but the book was published by Verlag Die Schmiede several months after his death.

The English translation by Willa and Edwin Muir was published by Schocken Books in 1948 in the collection The Penal Colony. All individual stories in the collection have also been translated before by various translators.

Contents
 "Erstes Leid" ("First Sorrow")
 "Eine kleine Frau" ("A Little Woman")
 "Ein Hungerkünstler" ("A Hunger Artist")
 "Josefine, die Sängerin oder Das Volk der Mäuse" (Josephine the Singer, or the Mouse Folk")

References

1924 short story collections
Books published posthumously
Short story collections by Franz Kafka
Schocken Books books